Gjoa Haven (Inuktitut: Uqsuqtuuq, syllabics: ᐅᖅᓱᖅᑑᖅ , meaning "lots of fat", referring to the abundance of sea mammals in the nearby waters;  or [ɡʒɔa evən]) is an Inuit hamlet in Nunavut, above the Arctic Circle, located in the Kitikmeot Region,  northeast of Yellowknife, Northwest Territories. It is the only settlement on King William Island.

Etymology
The name Gjoa Haven is from the Norwegian  or "Gjøa's Harbour"; it was named by early 20th-century polar explorer Roald Amundsen after his ship Gjøa. This was derived from the old Norse name Gyða, a compressed compound form of Guðfríðr ( "god" and  "beautiful"').

History 

In 1903, the Norwegian explorer Roald Amundsen had entered the area on his ship Gjøa in an expedition intending to travel through the Northwest Passage. By October the straits through which he was travelling began to ice up. Amundsen put Gjøa into a natural harbour on the southeast coast of King William Island. He stayed there, in what Amundsen called "the finest little harbor in the world", for nearly two years. He and his crew spent much of that time with the local Netsilik, learning from them the skills to live off the land and travel efficiently in the Arctic environment. This knowledge proved to be vital for Amundsen's later successful exploration to the South Pole. He explored the Boothia Peninsula, searching for the exact location of the north magnetic pole.

Some Inuit in Gjoa Haven with European ancestry have claimed to be descendants of Amundsen (or one of his six crew, whose names have not remained as well known). Accounts by members of the expedition told of their relations with Inuit women, and historians have speculated that Amundsen might also have taken a partner, although he wrote a warning against this. Specifically, half brothers Bob Konona and Paul Ikuallaq say that their father Luke Ikuallaq (b. 1904) told them on his deathbed that he was the son of Amundsen. Konona said that their father Ikuallaq was left out on the ice to die after his birth, as his European ancestry made him illegitimate to the Inuit, threatening their community. His Inuit grandparents saved him. In 2012, Y-DNA analysis, with the families' permission, showed that Ikuallaq (and his sons) was not a match to the direct male line of Amundsen. Not all descendants claiming European ancestry have been tested for a match to Amundsen, nor has there been a comparison of Ikuallaq's DNA to that of other European members of Amundsen's crew.

Permanent European-style settlement at Gjoa Haven started in 1927 when the Hudson's Bay Company opened a trading post. In 1941 Henry Larsen reached the post from the west. The settlement has attracted the traditionally nomadic Inuit  as they have adapted a more settled lifestyle.

In 1961, the town's population was 110. By 2001, the population was 960 according to the census, as most Inuit have moved from their traditional camps to be close to the healthcare and educational facilities available at Gjoa Haven.

The community is served by the Gjoa Haven Airport and by annual supply sealift. The area is home to CAM-CB, a North Warning System site.

Demographics 

The median age of the community was 23.0 with 22.0 for men and 23.8 for women. The average age was 26.5 with 26.4 for men and 26.6 for women.

Attractions

Nattilik Heritage Centre - a museum and heritage centre, opened on 17 October 2013, with a collection of handmade harpoons, snow goggles and snow knives purchased by Amundsen and repatriated to Canada and to the community from where they first came, after years on display at the Museum of Cultural History, Oslo. There is local art available for purchasing.
 Northwest Passage Territorial Park, shows the history of the exploration of the Northwest Passage as it relates to the area

Religion
Two churches are located in the hamlet:
 Immaculate Heart of Mary Roman Catholic Church
 Old Gjoa Haven Church

Government services

Local
 Gjoa Haven RCMP Detachment
 Gjoa Haven Fire Department
 Gjoa Haven Hamlet Council
 Gjoa Haven Continuing Care - a 10-bed, 24/7 health care facility opened in 2010

Territorial
 Gjoa Haven Nunavut Water Board
 Gjoa Haven Lands Administration Office
 Nunavut Social Services Department
 Nunavut Power Corporation
 Nunavut Economic Development Office

Climate
Gjoa Haven has a tundra climate (ET) with short but cool summers and long cold winters.

Economy

Most employment in Gjoa Haven is with government services; there are a few commercial employers:
 CAP Enterprises Limited – construction and heavy equipment
 Northern Store – retail store
 The Inns North Amundsen Hotel – 16 rooms in a two-storey structure built in 1995
 Qikiqtaq Co-op Limited – retail store
 Gjoa Haven Community Airport Radio Station – operating from Gjoa Haven Airport

Wrecks of HMS Erebus and HMS Terror National Historic Site 

The discovery of HMS Terror and HMS Erebus shipwrecks from the Franklin's lost expedition is expected to bring increased tourism to Gjoa Haven, the nearest community to the Wrecks of HMS Erebus and HMS Terror National Historic Site. Public access to the site is not allowed. To protect the site, Inuit from Gjoa Haven are employed as guardians, camping near the wreck sites to monitor access to the sites. The Nattilik Heritage Centre will be expanded to create a visitor centre for the historic site.

Education
Gjoa Haven has three schools:
 Quqshuun Ilihakvik Elementary School
 Qiqirtaq Ilihakvik High School
 Nunavut Arctic College

Broadband communications

The community has been served by the Qiniq network since 2005. Qiniq is a fixed wireless service to homes and businesses, connecting to the outside world via a satellite backbone. The Qiniq network is designed and operated by SSi Canada. In 2017, the network was upgraded to 4G LTE technology, and 2G-GSM for mobile voice.

Culture 

Square dancing is very popular in Gjoa Haven with many teams competing in annual showdowns (square dance tournaments). Inuit learned square dancing from the Scottish and American whalers active in the area in the mid-1800s. It is generally accompanied by accordion (or concertina) and fiddles and has its roots in round dances from Great Britain rather than Western American square dance. A single dance can take from 40 minutes to over an hour.

Notable people
 Leona Aglukkaq, politician, first Inuk to be appointed to the Cabinet of Canada.
 Tony Akoak, territorial politician
 Michael Angottitauruq, territorial politician
 Uriash Puqiqnak, soapstone carver and territorial politician
 Simon Tookoome, author

See also
List of municipalities in Nunavut

References

Further reading
Huntford, R. (2003). Scott and Amundsen: The last place on earth. London: Abacus.,

External links

Official website of the Hamlet of Gjoa Haven
Aerial photos of Gjoa Haven
Gjoa Haven, Government of Nunavut
About Gjoa Haven, Inuit Art/Eskimo Art

 
Hamlets in the Kitikmeot Region
Populated places in Arctic Canada
Hudson's Bay Company trading posts in Nunavut
Ports and harbours of Nunavut
Populated places established in 1927
1927 establishments in Canada
Road-inaccessible communities of Nunavut